Michael McCarthy (born 1950) is the Roman Catholic Bishop of Rockhampton in Queensland, Australia.

References 

1950 births
Living people
Roman Catholic bishops of Rockhampton